State Route 34 (SR 34) is a  state highway in St. Clair and Talladega counties, in the U.S. state of Alabama. The highway begins at its intersection with SR 77 north of Talladega and ends at its intersection with U.S. Route 231 (US 231) south of Pell City.

Route description

SR 34 is a two-lane highway that travels through rural areas in eastern Alabama. Besides the highways it intersects at its termini, it does not intersect with any other state routes or U.S. Highways. Also, besides connecting the cities of Talladega and Pell City, one of the main functions of SR 34 is that it serves as one of several highways that lead motorists to and from Talladega Superspeedway, the site of two NASCAR Sprint Cup races.
It is also called Stemley Bridge Road and traverses over the Coosa River and passes Stemley Road Elementary School.

Major intersections

See also

References

034
Transportation in St. Clair County, Alabama
Transportation in Talladega County, Alabama